The Cliff Hanger Stakes is an American Thoroughbred horse race run annually at Monmouth Park in East Rutherford, New Jersey during late September/early October. Open to horses age three and older, it is now contested on turf over a distance of  miles.  Currently the purse is $100,000.

Known as the Cliff Hanger Handicap until 2008, it was raced on dirt from 1978 through 1981 and again in 1985 and 1987. Prior to 1982, it was restricted to horses bred in the State of New Jersey.

Records
Speed  record:
 8.5 Furlongs – 1:39 2/5 – Wanderkin (1988), Dixie Bayou (1997)
 9 Furlongs – 1:46.16 – Winning Cause (2014)
Most wins:
 2 – Erin's Tiger (1982, 1983)
 2 – Late Act (1984, 1985)’

Most wins by an owner:
 2 – Greentree Stable (1984, 1985)
 2 – Live Oak Racing (1994, 2006)

Most wins by a jockey:
 3 – Jorge Velásquez (1980, 1982, 1983)

Most wins by a trainer:
 2 – Joseph H. Pierce Jr. (1980, 1987)
 2 – Richard Nieminski (1982, 1983)
 2 – Jonathan Sheppard (1987, 1989)
 2 – Christophe Clement (2013, 2015)

Winners since 1999

Earlier winners

 1998 – Mi Narrow
 1997 – Dixie Bayou
 1996 – Thorny Crown
 1995 – Mighty Forum
 1994 – Binary Light
 1993 – Excellent Tipper
 1992 – Roman Envoy
 1991 – Finder's Choice
 1990 – Chas' Whim
 1989 – Ten Keys
 1988 – Wanderkin
 1987 – Silver Comet
 1987 – Foligno
 1986 – Explosive Darling
 1985 – Late Act
 1984 – Late Act
 1984 – Cozzene
 1983 – Erin's Tiger
 1982 – Erin's Tiger
 1982 – Acaroid
 1981 – Bill Wheeler
 1980 – Quality T. V.
 1979 – Exclusively Mine
 1978 – Mr. Lincroft
 1977 – Dan Horn

References
 History and winners details of the Cliff Hanger Handicap as at 2007 at a Meadowlands website
 Cliff Hanger Stakes at Pedigree Query

Open mile category horse races
Horse races in New Jersey
Turf races in the United States
Recurring sporting events established in 1977
1977 establishments in New Jersey